Danijel Rašić (born 5 October 1988 in Split) is a Croatian football player currently playing for HNK Zmaj Makarska in the Croatian Third Football League.

Career
Rašić started his career, alongside his identical twin brother Damir, in their hometown club Zmaj Makarska, before moving on to the Hajduk Split academy. Despite alleged interest from Panathinaikos, and games for the Croatia U19 team, the brothers didn't get contracts with Hajduk Split, and signed with the Druga HNL team Mosor. After a season there they both moved to Imotski, and Danijel stayed for two seasons before rejoining his brother at the Prva HNL team RNK Split.

Not getting a chance at Split, he moved on to Varaždin, playing there until the club was suspended. In the summer of 2012 Rašić rejoined his first club Zmaj Makarska in the Treća HNL Jug for a season, followed by another half-season stint at Imotski at the same level. At the beginning of 2014, Rašić joined the Slovenian PrvaLiga team Krka.

References

External links

PrvaLiga profile 

1988 births
Living people
Footballers from Split, Croatia
Twin sportspeople
Association football fullbacks
Croatian footballers
Croatia youth international footballers
NK Mosor players
NK Imotski players
RNK Split players
NK Varaždin players
HNK Zmaj Makarska players
NK Krka players
NK Metalleghe-BSI players
Croatian Football League players
First Football League (Croatia) players
Slovenian PrvaLiga players
Premier League of Bosnia and Herzegovina players
Croatian expatriate footballers
Expatriate footballers in Slovenia
Croatian expatriate sportspeople in Slovenia
Expatriate footballers in Bosnia and Herzegovina
Croatian expatriate sportspeople in Bosnia and Herzegovina